Zuri may refer to:

 Zuri, Africa, a former Roman city and bishopric in Africa Proconsularis, now in Aïn-Djour, Tunisia, and a Latin Catholic titular see
 Züri, a name of Zürich city, Switzerland
 Zuri (comics), a Marvel Comics character associated with Black Panther
 Zuri Hall (born 1988), American television host
 Zuri Lawrence (born 1970), American boxer
 Zuri Tibby (born 1995), American fashion model
 Zuri, a frazione of the comune of Ghilarza, Sardinia, Italy
 Zuri (given name)